Acanthastrea is a genus of large polyp stony corals in the family Lobophylliidae. The colonies are massive and usually flat. The corallites are either circular or angular in shape. The septa are thick near the wall of the corallite, becoming thin near the columella, and have tall teeth. The polyps are extended only at night.

The genus contains the following species:

 Acanthastrea brevis Milne Edwards & Haime, 1849
 Acanthastrea echinata (Dana, 1846)
 Acanthastrea hemprichii (Ehrenberg, 1834)
 Acanthastrea minuta Moll & Best, 1984
 Acanthastrea pachysepta (Chevalier, 1975)
 Acanthastrea polygonalis† Martin, 1880
 Acanthastrea rotundoflora Chevalier, 1975
 Acanthastrea subechinata Veron, 2002

References

Lobophylliidae
Scleractinia genera